Syed Javed Hasnain Shah is a Pakistani politician who has been a member of the National Assembly of Pakistan since August 2018. Previously he was a member of the National Assembly from 2008 to June 2010.

Political career
He was elected to the National Assembly of Pakistan as a candidate of Pakistan Muslim League (N) (PML-N) from Constituency NA-68 (Sargodha-V) in the 2008 general election. He received 80,174 votes and defeated Mian Mazhar Ahmed Qureshi, a candidate of Pakistan Muslim League (Q) (PML-Q).

In June 2010, the authenticity of his bachelor's degree was challenged in the Election Tribunal of the Lahore High Court. The election tribunal subsequently disqualified him as member of the National Assembly after the degree was proved bogus.

In December 2014, he was acquitted in fake degree case.

He was re-elected to the National Assembly as a candidate of PML-N  from Constituency NA-92 (Sargodha-V) in 2018 Pakistani general election.

References

Living people
Pakistani MNAs 2018–2023
Pakistani MNAs 2008–2013
Year of birth missing (living people)